Banging the Drum is the third studio album by American hardcore punk band Scream, released in 1986 through Dischord Records.

Track listing 
All songs written by Scream.
"Banging the Drum" – 0:55
"People People" – 5:15
"I.C.Y.U.O.D." – 4:38
"Nod to the East" – 0:59
"Mineshaft Burning" – 3:33
"The Rhythm Beating"  – 4:20
"Feel Like That" – 5:09
"Walking by Myself" – 3:48
"When I Rise" – 3:36
"The Sing It Up Kidz" – 4:18
"Choke Word" – 3:38

Credits 
Scream
Franz Stahl – guitars, vocals, acoustic guitar on "When I Rise"
Robert Lee Davidson – guitars, vocals, acoustic guitar on "Choke Word"
Skeeter Thompson – bass, vocals
Kent Stax – drums, vocals
Pete Stahl – lead vocals

Additional personnel
John Loder – producer
Ian MacKaye – producer, backing vocals
Don Zientara – producer
Joey Pea – assistant engineer
Tos Nieuwenhuizen – backing vocals
Amy Plckering – backing vocals
Bobby Madden – keyboards on "Choke Word"
Tomas Squip – photography
Jeff Nelson – graphics

References 

Scream (band) albums
1986 albums